Washington is a city in and the county seat of Washington County, Pennsylvania, United States. The population was 13,176 at the 2020 census. A part of the Pittsburgh metropolitan area in the southwestern part of the state, the city is home to Washington & Jefferson College and Pony League baseball.

History

Delaware Indian chief Tangooqua, commonly known as "Catfish", had a camp on a branch of Chartiers Creek, in what is now part of the city of Washington. The French labeled the area "Wissameking", meaning "catfish place", as early as 1757. The area of Washington was settled by many immigrants from Scotland and the north of Ireland along with settlers from eastern and central parts of colonial Virginia.  It was first settled by colonists around 1768.

The Pennsylvania General Assembly passed an act on March 28, 1781, erecting the County of Washington and naming "Catfish Camp" as the place for holding the first election. This was the first county in the U.S. to be named in honor of General George Washington. David Hoge laid out a plan of lots immediately after the legislature's action. His original plot carried the name "Bassett, alias Dandridge Town," but before the plot was recorded, lines were drawn through "Bassett, alias Dandridge Town" with ink, and the word "Washington" was written above. There have long been rumors among locals that the town was named Washington because George Washington spent the night in the region once. This is not true however; Washington had never been to the area.

The original plot dedicated a tract of ground to the people for recreational purposes. A lot was given for a courthouse where the current building now stands, and Lots 43 and 102, according to the plan, were presented by Hoge to "His Excellency, General Washington, and Mrs. Washington."

Washington, Pennsylvania, was the center for the 'Whiskey Rebellion' of 1791, which was one of the first open rebellions against the new U.S. government and Constitution. The rebellion was centered on a tax being imposed on whiskey distillation in the region. The house of David Bradford, one of the leaders of the rebellion, is now a museum devoted to the Whiskey Rebellion, the David Bradford House, located on South Main Street of the city.

The town was incorporated as a borough on February 13, 1810, and became a city of the third class in 1924.

In August 1875, construction began of the  Waynesburg and Washington Railroad, conceived by John Day in 1874 and chartered in 1875. Passenger services ended in 1929, conversion to standard gauge followed in 1944, when it was renamed the Waynesburg Secondary. Freight services ended in 1976, although part of the line still survives for access to a coal mine.

The discovery of oil and natural gas among the Washington oil field caused a boom period from the 1880s to the early 1900s.

James B. Wilson chartered the Washington Electric Street Railways in 1889 with construction beginning in November 1890. The first line was built from the Waynesburg and Washington Narrow Gauge station to Wilson Orchard, just north of the present day site of the Washington Hospital.

In 1903, the Washington and Canonsburg Railway Company linked Washington to Canonsburg, Pennsylvania with a trolley line. The company was bought by the Philadelphia Company in 1906, later becoming part of the Pittsburgh Railway Company, linking through to Pittsburgh as part of their interurban service in 1909. The line closed on August 29, 1953. A short section of the line and a number of trolley cars are preserved at the Pennsylvania Trolley Museum north of the city.

According to a walking tour brochure researched and written by two Washington & Jefferson College professors in 2012, fifteen American presidents have visited Washington before, during, or after their presidential terms: James Monroe (1817); Andrew Jackson (several stops 1820s and 1830s); John Quincy Adams (1843); Ulysses S. Grant (several stops 1860s and 1870s); William Henry Harrison; James K. Polk; Zachary Taylor; Benjamin Harrison (1876, 1892);  William Howard Taft (1916); Warren G. Harding (1922); Franklin D. Roosevelt (1932); Harry S. Truman (1953); John F. Kennedy (1962); Bill Clinton (1992, 2008); Barack Obama (2008).

Geography

Surrounding communities
Washington has four borders, including East Washington to the east, South Strabane Township from the north to south-southeast, North Franklin Township from the south to southwest, and Canton Township from the west to northwest.

Climate 
Washington has a humid continental climate (Köppen Dfb), with warm summers and cold, snowy winters.

Demographics

As of the census of 2010, there were 13,663 people living in the city. The population density was 4,140.3 people per square mile. The racial makeup of the city was (10,373) 75.92% White, (2,803) 20.52% African American,(131) 0.96% Asian, and (107) 0.78% from other races. Hispanic or Latino of any race were (249) 1.82% of the population.

As of the census of 2000, there were 15,268 people, 6,259 households, and 3,486 families living in the city. The population density was 5,199.2 people per square mile (2,005.1/km2). There were 7,111 housing units at an average density of 2,421.5 per square mile (933.9/km2). The racial makeup of the city was 81.88% White, 14.60% African American, 0.15% Native American, 0.45% Asian, 0.02% Pacific Islander, 0.61% from other races, and 2.29% from two or more races. Hispanic or Latino of any race were 0.94% of the population.

There were 6,259 households, out of which 24.3% had children under the age of 18 living with them, 34.7% were married couples living together, 17.1% had a female householder with no husband present, and 44.3% were non-families. 38.0% of all households were made up of individuals, and 15.8% had someone living alone who was 65 years of age or older. The average household size was 2.20 and the average family size was 2.91.

In the city, the population was spread out, with 21.2% under the age of 18, 13.2% from 18 to 24, 28.0% from 25 to 44, 20.9% from 45 to 64, and 16.7% who were 65 years of age or older. The median age was 36 years. For every 100 females, there were 88.3 males. For every 100 females age 18 and over, there were 84.6 males.

The median income for a household in the city was $25,764, and the median income for a family was $34,862. Males had a median income of $29,977 versus $22,374 for females. The per capita income for the city was $14,818. 20.7% of the population and 16.4% of families were below the poverty line. Out of the total population, 29.2% of those under the age of 18 and 15.8% of those 65 and older were living below the poverty line.

Religion
Founded in 1891, Beth Israel Congregation is the only synagogue in Washington County. Immaculate Conception Church is a large Catholic church which serves the community and has a long history.

Economy

Major employers in Washington include The Washington Hospital, the government of Washington County, and Washington & Jefferson College.

Culture
Washington Symphony Orchestra, founded 2002, offers four to five concerts annually. The Washington Community Theatre presents several musicals and other productions throughout the year, with a feature production held each June in the Main Pavilion at Washington Park. WCT celebrated its 40th anniversary in 2009.

Also in the city are two historic homes, that of David Bradford on South Main Street and that of F. Julius LeMoyne on East Maiden Street. Bradford's home was later the birthplace of American realist author Rebecca Harding Davis in 1831. LeMoyne was an ardent abolitionist whose home was part of the Underground Railroad; LeMoyne was a doctor who also built the first crematory in America. The David Bradford House and F. Julius LeMoyne House are listed on the National Register of Historic Places, along with the Administration Building, Washington and Jefferson College, Dr. Joseph Maurer House, Pennsylvania Railroad Freight Station, Washington Armory, Washington County Courthouse, and Washington County Jail.

Washington is home to PONY Baseball and Softball's headquarters and the annual PONY League World Series (for 13- and 14-year-old players). The PONY League World Series is held at historic Lew Hays Field located in the city's Washington Park. The Washington Wild Things minor league baseball team has been based out of the city since 1997. On January 27, 2006, to commemorate the Pittsburgh Steelers' appearance in Super Bowl XL, the city council voted to symbolically rename the city "Steelers, Pennsylvania" through February 5, 2006.

Education

Washington is home to Washington & Jefferson College, a small, co-educational private liberal arts college founded in 1781. Located in downtown Washington, the college now enrolls over 1,500 students. It is noted as an excellent pre-med and pre-law institution due to its fine liberal arts curriculum and is considered a good preparatory school for graduate-level studies in general. W&J's  suburban campus includes more than 40 academic, recreational, and residential buildings, as well as a  biological field station. In the 2006 U.S. News & World Report "America's Best Colleges" guide, W&J was ranked #94 among the top 100 Liberal Arts Schools in the US.

Media
The Observer-Reporter is a daily newspaper that traces its history to 1808. Washington's commercial radio station is WJPA (95.3 FM / 1450 AM), located on South Main Street in downtown Washington.  Washington & Jefferson College is home to WNJR FM radio station and the Red & Black college newspaper.

Notable people

Edward Acheson – Inventor
Ernest F. Acheson – U.S. Representative 
Absalom Baird – Union army general
Susan Porter Benson – historian
Jim Carmichael – Ohio state representative
Alexander Clark – Businessman, activist, and United States ambassador to Liberia
Rebecca Harding Davis – Author, journalist
Emerson Hart – Singer/songwriter/guitarist for Tonic
Pete Henry – Former NFL player/coach, member of Pro Football Hall of Fame
Paul Jacobs – Grammy Award Winning Organist
John Kanzius – inventor
Isaac Leet – U.S. Representative
Francis Julius LeMoyne – abolitionist
Walter Joseph Marm, Jr. – Medal of Honor recipient
Edward Martin – Governor of Pa. 1943–1947; U.S. Senator 1946-1958
Philo McGiffin – Soldier of fortune
Robert Munce – President of Suffolk University in Boston, Massachusetts
Dave Pahanish – Writer, Musician 
Dave Palone, harness racing driver
George Parros – Ice Hockey Player
Joey Powers – Recording Artist
Jerry Sandusky – Former player and assistant coach of the Penn State Nittany Lions football team, convicted in the Penn State sex abuse scandal
Michael Seibert – US Olympic pairs ice skater in the 1980s. Trained at the Washington Park ice rink
Paige Spara – Actress with credits including The Good Doctor and Kevin from Work
Gene Steratore – NFL referee
Maria Judson Strean – Painter
Sylvester Terkay – Professional wrestler and mixed martial artist
Joseph Albert Walker – Astronaut and test pilot x-15 record holder for speed and altitude

Charles Fremont West – African American athlete, Rose Bowl quarterback (1922), medical doctor
Dennis E. Wisnosky – Chief Technical Officer, Department of Defense Business Mission Area (ret), Father of IDEF
Octavia B. Wynbush - African American author and educator
Bud Yorkin – Film director and producer (Sanford and Son, All in the Family, Start the Revolution Without Me)

See also
Shorty's Lunch

References

External links

 
 
 

 
Cities in Pennsylvania
Cities in Washington County, Pennsylvania
County seats in Pennsylvania
Populated places established in 1768
Pittsburgh metropolitan area
1768 establishments in Pennsylvania